Orocrambus ramosellus is a moth in the family Crambidae. It was described by Henry Doubleday in 1843.
 It is endemic to New Zealand, where it has been recorded in the North and South Islands. The habitat of this species consists of pastures.

The wingspan is 23–29 mm. Adults have been recorded on wing from October to July.

The larvae feed on Festuca novaezealandiae, Poa cita (formerly Poa caespitosa), Agrostis tenuis, Alopercus pratensis, Bromus catharticus and Poa annua.

References

Crambinae
Moths of New Zealand
Moths described in 1843
Endemic fauna of New Zealand
Taxa named by Henry Doubleday
Endemic moths of New Zealand